The Franchise is a 1983 novel written by former Dallas Cowboys wide receiver/tight end Peter Gent.

The book follows a cynical college football quarterback's rise to superstardom in the professional ranks with a corrupt expansion team, whom he leads to a championship.  While it shared some of the themes of Gent's 1973 novel, North Dallas Forty, The Franchise adds political corruption and murder.

Plot summary
Taylor Rusk is a star college quarterback and a can't-miss prospect in The League.  Through various illegal means, North Texas is awarded an expansion franchise.  As expected, the expansion Texas Pistols draft Rusk number one.  The Pistols have a five-year plan to turn the team into champions, and getting Taylor Rusk ready is the key.  But Rusk is on to the corruption and refuses to be a victim.  With his college coach at the helm and "old league" legends mentoring him, Taylor Rusk plays The League's game until it's time for him to make his most daring move to bring it down.

But along the way, Rusk is betrayed.  One teammate, a chronic con man, becomes the Pistols' general manager and ultimately betrays him.  Another teammate suffers a devastating knee injury and the subsequent surgery is botched.  Rusk sees him get tossed aside and, due largely to steroid abuse, he murders his family and commits suicide.

Five years later, the Texas Pistols are world champions, but Taylor Rusk has little time to celebrate.  He's got to save the life of another victim: the woman he's fallen in love with — who's also the mother of his son.  They ultimately take control of the Texas Pistols for him.

Critical reception
Kirkus Reviews called the "overlong" novel "a noisy, messy, unconvincing mixture of black comedy, shrill soap opera, and violent, bloody mystery-melodrama." The Washington Post wrote that "underlying the good-ol'-boy humor and Ludlum-like violence, there is a seriousness, a feeling that Gent, as he did in North Dallas Forty, could be revealing something that the National Football League would rather we did not know."

References

1983 American novels
American football books
American sports novels
Novels set in Texas